Lalari may refer to several places:

Lalari Yek, a village in Tang-e Haft Rural District, Papi District, Khorramabad County, Lorestan Province, Iran
Lalari Do, a village in Tang-e Haft Rural District, Papi District, Khorramabad County, Lorestan Province, Iran